The Walking Dead: Original Soundtrack – Vol. 1 is a soundtrack album featuring tracks from and inspired by AMC's television series The Walking Dead released March 17, 2013, by Universal Republic Records.

Prior to the album's release, some of the tracks were released as digital singles starting with "The Parting Glass" by series stars Emily Kinney and Lauren Cohan in October 2012. The album peaked at number 54 on the Billboard 200 chart for the week of April 6.

Critical reception 

Rick Florino of Artistdirect cited the album as the "best soundtrack of the year" and said it was "everything it should be and so much more" while Heather Phares of AllMusic was displeased with the lack of tracks composed by Bear McCreary that appear in the series, saying it "should please fans who enjoy the show's overall mood" but that "it doesn't capture its essence the way a soundtrack with more of McCreary's score would have."

Track listing 

Notes
 Track 1 ("Lead Me Home") is featured in the third season episode "Clear" and in the midseason 3 trailer.
 Track 3 ("You Are the Wilderness") is featured in the third season episode "Prey".
 Track 4 ("Love Bug") is featured in the third season episode "Say the Word".
 Track 5 ("Warm Shadow") is featured in the third season episode "Arrow on the Doorpost". 
 Track 7 ("The Parting Glass") is featured in the third season episode "Seed".

Credits adapted from AllMusic.

Release history

Charts

References

External links 
 

2013 soundtrack albums
Television soundtracks
The Walking Dead music
Universal Republic Records soundtracks